Armando Latini (20 May 1913 - 1976) was an Italian track cyclist who won a silver medal in the 4 km team pursuit at the 1936 Olympics.

References

External links
 
 
 
 
 

1913 births
1976 deaths
Italian male cyclists
Olympic silver medalists for Italy
Olympic cyclists of Italy
Olympic medalists in cycling
Cyclists at the 1936 Summer Olympics
Medalists at the 1936 Summer Olympics
Cyclists from Rome